Henrietta Hardy Hammond (1854 – ) was an American novelist.  

Henrietta Hardy Hammond was born on 1854 in Virginia.

Jane Turner Censer identifies Hammond as one of a number of popular Southern novelists of the 1870s and 1880s who wrote about self-confident and self-sufficient heroines. In A Fair Philosopher, Hammond's heroine starts a philosophy reading group while supporting her family. The Georgians depicts the relationship between Félise Orlanoff, a married French countess who inherits a Georgia estate, and Marcus Laurens, a Southern lawyer.

Henrietta Hardy Hammond died on November 24, 1883, in New York City.

Bibliography

Novels 

 Her Waiting Heart (1875) as Lou Capsadell
 The Georgians (1881), anonymously published as No. 3 in the "No Name Series"
 A Fair Philosopher (1882), as Henri Daugé

Non-fiction 

 Woman's Secrets, or How to be Beautiful (1876)

References 

Created via preloaddraft
1883 deaths
1854 births
American women novelists